Thangam Manasu Thangam is a 1960 Indian Tamil-language film directed by R. M. Krishnaswamy and produced by Friend Ramaswamy. The film stars Prem Nazir and M. N. Rajam.

Cast 
Adapted from Film News Anandan's database:
 Prem Nazir as Rajan
 M. N. Rajam
 K. A. Thangavelu
 C. R. Vijayakumari
 Friend Ramaswamy
 Kumudhini
 T. K. Ramachandran
 M. Saroja
 N. Narayana Pillai

Production 
Thangam Manasu Thangam was directed by R. M. Krishnaswamy, and produced by Friend Ramaswamy under Friend Pictures. The story was written by K. P. Kottakkaara, and the dialogues by A. L. Narayanan. Cinematography was handled by P. B. Mani, and editing by R. M. Venugopal.

Soundtrack 
The soundtrack was composed by K. V. Mahadevan, and the lyrics were written by A. Maruthakasi, Thanjai N. Ramaiah Dass and Abdul Ghafoor Sahib.

Reception 
The reviewer from the magazine Kalki praised Prem Nazir's performance.

References

External links 
 

1960 films
1960s Tamil-language films
Films scored by K. V. Mahadevan